Károly Bartha (4 November 1907 – 4 February 1991) was a Hungarian swimmer who competed in the 1924 Summer Olympics. He won a bronze medal in the 100 m backstroke event.

References

External links
 Profile of Károly Bartha at Database Olympics
 Profile of Károly Bartha at Sports-Reference

1907 births
1991 deaths
Swimmers from Budapest
Hungarian male swimmers
Male backstroke swimmers
Olympic swimmers of Hungary
Swimmers at the 1924 Summer Olympics
Olympic bronze medalists for Hungary
Olympic bronze medalists in swimming
European Aquatics Championships medalists in swimming
Medalists at the 1924 Summer Olympics